WXMS-LP, UHF analog channel 27, was a low-powered MeTV-affiliated television station licensed to Jackson, Mississippi, United States. The station was by American Spirit Media, making it a sister station to Fox affiliate WDBD, and operated by Raycom Media, then-owner of NBC affiliate WLBT.

History
WXMS launched on December 13, 1999, on cable as a primary affiliate of the WB and secondary affiliate of UPN. Previously, cable viewers were able to see WB programming via Chicago's WGN-TV, which had dropped WB programming from its national superstation feed several months earlier. WXMS launched a low power signal on channel 27 on July 2, 2000. On October 7, 2001, WXMS became a primary UPN affiliate after ceding its WB affiliation to sister station WDBD, which had defected from the Fox network.

On January 5, 2006, WXMS lost its UPN affiliation to WRBJ and became an independent station. WXMS simulcast with its sister station WBMS-CA.

WXMS was sold by Jackson Television to Roundtable Broadcasting in early 2010. Roundtable Broadcasting filed to sell WXMS and WDBD to American Spirit Media in July 2012. As part of the deal, the station's operations were taken over by Raycom Media, owner of WLBT, under a shared services agreement; American Spirit also acquired WBMS-CA from Vicksburg Broadcasting.

WXMS, which had only ever operated through a series of special temporary authority grants in lieu of a permanent license, left the air on February 11, 2013. In advance of the most recent STA's expiration on January 3, 2014, American Spirit Media on January 2 returned the station's construction permit to the Federal Communications Commission,  which cancelled it the next day.

References

XMS-LP
Television channels and stations established in 1999
1999 establishments in Mississippi
Television channels and stations disestablished in 2013
2013 disestablishments in Mississippi
Defunct television stations in the United States
XMS-LP